The 1936 Green Bay Packers season was the franchise 's 18th season overall, 16th season in the National Football League, and the 18th under head coach  Curly Lambeau. The team improved on their 8–4 record from 1935 and finished with a 10–1–1 record.  Thus earning them a first-place finish in the NFL's Western Division.

The Packers met the Eastern Division champion Boston Redskins (7–5) in the NFL Championship Game, held at the Polo Grounds in New York City.  The favored Packers had won the two regular season meetings with Boston and won 21–6 for their fourth NFL Championship, first earned by playoff victory, and first since the three-championship streak of 1929–1931.

The Packers' 1936 schedule began with six consecutive home games, with the remainder of the season on the road.

Offseason

NFL Draft

Regular season

Schedule

Note: Intra-division opponents are in bold text.

Playoffs

The game was moved by Boston ownership and played at the Polo Grounds in New York City.

Standings

Awards and records
Arnie Herber, NFL Leader, passing yards (1,239)

Footnotes

External links

 Charles G. Clarke (director), "Pigskin Champions," Metro-Goldwyn-Mayer, 1937. —Short film.

Green Bay Packers seasons
Green Bay Packers
National Football League championship seasons
Green Bay Packers